Bila Krynytsia is an urban-type settlement in Zhytomyr Raion, Zhytomyr Oblast, Ukraine. Population:  In 2001, population was 1,077.

References

Urban-type settlements in Zhytomyr Raion
Radomyslsky Uyezd